The N63 road is a national secondary road in Ireland.

En route it passes through Mountbellew, Roscommon Town, crosses the River Shannon at Lanesborough.

References
Roads Act 1993 (Classification of National Roads) (Amendment) Order 2018 – Department of Transport

National secondary roads in the Republic of Ireland
Roads in County Galway
Roads in County Roscommon
Roads in County Longford